Tobífera Formation is a volcano-sedimentary formation of Middle to Late Jurassic age. The formation is crops out in the Magallanes Region in southern Patagonia and Tierra del Fuego of Chile, the Santa Cruz Province of southern Argentina, and in the subsurface of the Malvinas Basin offshore Argentina and the Falkland Islands.

Description 
The bulk of the formation originates from silicic pyroclastic material during a period of bimodal volcanism in Rocas Verdes Basin, a rift basin. The Tobífera Formation is grouped together with other formations of similar age in Patagonia in the Chon Aike Province an extraordinarily large province of silicic volcanism.

Except for some western and southern exposures most of the formation is buried and known only from boreholes in the Magallanes and Malvinas Basins. The formation is equivalent to El Quemado and Ibañez Formations. Tobífera Formation unconformably overlies metamorphic and igneous basement complexes of Cambrian age.

Deformation and metamorphism 
Much of the formation is folded and faulted as consequence of the Andean orogeny. At Última Esperanza Province the formation metamorphosed first under greenschist facies and then under prehnite-pumpellyite facies conditions. Some rhyolites of Tobífera Formation were incorporated into Cordillera Darwin Metamorphic Complex. The incorporation of part of Tobífera Formation in the metamorphic complex was accompanied by deformation and metamorphism and occurred in the context of the Andean orogeny in the Cretaceous.

References 

Geologic formations of Chile
Geologic formations of Argentina
Jurassic System of South America
Jurassic Argentina
Jurassic Chile
Jurassic volcanism
Tuff formations
Formations
Geology of Magallanes Region
Geology of Santa Cruz Province, Argentina
Geology of Patagonia
Geology of the Atlantic Ocean